Mary Margaret Perry (January 3, 1943 – June 3, 2012) was an American volleyball player. She competed at the 1964 and the 1968 Summer Olympics. She died at home of the rare disease, multiple system atrophy.

Early life
Perry was born in Burbank, California, in 1943. Her passion for volleyball began when she enrolled in Pierce Junior College and grew after she formed the South California volleyball team, the Renegades.

Olympics
In 1963, Perry was chosen for the US Women's Volleyball Team to compete at the Pan American Games in São Paulo, Brazil. The team won the gold medal. At the top of her sport throughout the 1960s, she went on to participate in two Olympiads in 1964 in Tokyo and the 1968 Olympics in Mexico City.

Life after the Olympics
After graduating from Cal State Northridge with a bachelor's degree in physical education in 1971, Perry taught and coached in Honolulu and at Cal State Hayward, where she earned her master's degrees in P.E. and Education.

Perry moved to Ashland, Oregon in 1986 and assisted coaching women's volleyball at Southern Oregon State College (now Southern Oregon University). She received her third master's degree in psychology from S.O.S.C. and coached senior citizens in fitness through Elderhostel. She produced the acclaimed fitness video, "Early Morning Stretch" and worked with geriatric patients through Jackson County Mental Health until her retirement in 2002.

Awards
In 1984, Perry was inducted into the Cal State Northridge Athletics Hall of Fame. In 2009, she was awarded the Flo Hyman All-Time Great Player Award and was inducted into the U.S. Volleyball Hall of Fame.

Death
Perry died at home of the rare disease, multiple system atrophy. At first she was diagnosed as having Parkinson's disease but that was later defined as Multiple System Atrophy, aka Parkinson plus syndrome.

References

External links
 

1943 births
2012 deaths
American women's volleyball players
Olympic volleyball players of the United States
Volleyball players at the 1964 Summer Olympics
Volleyball players at the 1968 Summer Olympics
Volleyball players at the 1963 Pan American Games
Volleyball players at the 1967 Pan American Games
Pan American Games gold medalists for the United States
Pan American Games silver medalists for the United States
Volleyball players from Los Angeles
Sportspeople from Ashland, Oregon
Southern Oregon University alumni
Neurological disease deaths in Oregon
Deaths from multiple system atrophy
Pan American Games medalists in volleyball
Medalists at the 1963 Pan American Games
Medalists at the 1967 Pan American Games
Cal State Northridge Matadors women's volleyball players